Marit Helene Fiane Grødum (née Christensen; born 11 December 1980) is a Norwegian former football central back. Christensen married Øystein Grødum on 31 August 2013 and changed her name to Marit Helene Fiane Grødum. Her last club was Amazon Grimstad of Norway's Toppserien league. She was member of the Norway women's national football team, having made her debut on 16 March 2003, in a match against the United States.

Club career
She started her career in Halsen IF, a local club in Larvik. As the women's teams of Halsen and rival club Nanset IF joined into one club, FK Larvik, Grødum became one of the key players of the club. Both she and the club made a Toppserien debut in 2000. Grødum scored one goal, but could not help the club avoid relegation. In 2002, Larvik and Grødum returned to Toppserien. Even though Larvik survived their second encounter with Toppserien, Grødum changed team to Asker. The stay in Asker was short, as only one year later Grødum continued her way east and ended up in Røa. Grødum proved to be vital to the club. In her first season in Røa, her team won the double, both the league and the cup. Over the next years, Røa with Grødum won the league and the cup twice each.

International career
Grødum also became an important part of the national team. When she quit the national team in October 2008, Grødum had made 62 appearances, scoring seven goals. She scored her first goal for Norway on 24 July 2004 in a match against Sweden.

She was part of the squad for the 2005 European Championships, in which Norway claimed silver, falling to Germany 3–1 in the championship match. She was also part of the team for the 2003 Women's World Cup, 2007 Women's World Cup and the 2008 Summer Olympics held in Beijing, China.

On 21 October 2008 Grødum and four other Røa players – Marie Knutsen, Guro Knutsen, Lene Mykjåland and Siri Nordby – made headlines when they announced in a press release that they would not be returning to the national team due to issues the five had with the national team leadership. While the press statement never mentioned coach Bjarne Berntsen's name, it was assumed that he was instrumental in their decision to quit the team. The retirement, interpreted by newspapers as a boycott, created widespread media attention.

Somewhat involuntarily, Grødum became the spokesperson for the five players, especially in a TV-debate with the Norwegian Football Association and coach Bjarne Berntsen. As of January 2009, the issue seemed far from soluble, but with Bjarne Berntsen's retirement and the arrival of a new chief trainer for the national team, Eli Landsem, Grødum was recalled to the side in December 2009 for training matches against China and England in La Manga Club, Spain in January 2010.

Veteran national coach Even Pellerud selected Grødum in Norway's squad for UEFA Women's Euro 2013 in Sweden. She started the final at Friends Arena, where Anja Mittag's goal gave the Germans their sixth successive European title.

Personal
Grødum is a qualified lawyer and works as a legal adviser to NISO, the Norske Idrettsutøveres Sentralorganisasjon.  Norwegian World Cup speed-skater winner Øystein Grødum and Marit became a couple the summer of 2006.  Their first child was born in autumn, 2010.

Career statistics
Statistics accurate as of match played 8 June 2013

Honors
Røa

 Toppserien: Winner  2004, 2007, 2008, 2009
 Norwegian Women's Cup: Winner 2004, 2006, 2008, 2009, 2010

Country

Norway
2003 FIFA Women's World Cup: Quarter-final
2007 FIFA Women's World Cup: Fourth place
2008 Summer Olympics in Beijing: Quarter-final
UEFA Women's Euro 2005: Runners-up
UEFA Women's Euro 2013: Runners-up

Individual
 UEFA Women's Championship All-Star Team: 2013

References

External links
 
 

1980 births
Living people
People from Vestby
Norwegian women's footballers
Norway women's international footballers
Footballers at the 2008 Summer Olympics
Olympic footballers of Norway
Røa IL players
Amazon Grimstad players
Asker Fotball (women) players
Toppserien players
2003 FIFA Women's World Cup players
2007 FIFA Women's World Cup players
Norwegian women lawyers
Women's association football central defenders
Sportspeople from Viken (county)
21st-century Norwegian lawyers